The 2012 FIA WTCC Race of Japan was the tenth round of the 2012 World Touring Car Championship season and the fifth running of the FIA WTCC Race of Japan. It was held on 21 October 2012 at the Suzuka Circuit in Suzuka City, Japan. The first race was won by Alain Menu for Chevrolet and the second race was won by Stefano D'Aste for Wiechers-Sport.

Background
After the previous round in the United States at Sonoma Raceway, the championship was being led jointly by Yvan Muller and Robert Huff on 315 points. Norbert Michelisz was leading the Yokohama Independents' Trophy. Chevrolet had the opportunity to secure the manufacturers championship.

There were a number of driver changes prior to the event, Darryl O'Young left Special Tuning Racing and later returned to bamboo-engineering. His replacement at STR was German racing driver and former FIA GT1 World Championship team owner René Münnich. Masaki Kano joined Liqui Moly Team Engstler for his home event, driving a naturally aspirated BMW 320si. Fellow Japanese racer Hiroki Yoshimoto joined Tuenti Racing Team for the event, driving the SUNRED SR León 1.6T raced up until the last event by Tiago Monteiro.

Monteiro switched to Honda Racing Team JAS for the final three rounds of the championship to debut the works Honda Civic S2000 TC in order to develop the car in preparation for a full programme in 2013.

Report

Free Practice
Muller set the pace in the Friday test session which was interrupted by a trio of red flags, leading a Chevrolet 1–2–3 with Pepe Oriola the leading SEAT in fourth.

Chevrolet continued to set the pace on Saturday in FP1, this time courtesy of Alain Menu at the head of another Chevrolet 1–2–3. Monteiro set the fourth fastest time in his new Honda Civic and Oriola was the quickest independent driver. Local driver Yoshimoto was seventh.

Menu topped the times once again in FP2, although surprisingly the Chevrolet 1–2–3 from earlier on was not repeated as Fernando Monje set the third fastest time in his Tuenti Racing Team SEAT León.

Qualifying
After setting the pace throughout free practice, Menu went on to take pole position ahead of Muller and Huff while Chevrolet wrapped up the manufacturers title. Much of the attention was on the Honda of Monteiro, who at one point looked likely to drop out in Q1 until a last minute quick lap got him through to the second session. He finished Q2 eleventh behind Stefano D'Aste who would take his third reversed grid pole position of the year in race two. Independents' Trophy leader Michelisz could only manage fourteenth, five places behind trophy rival Oriola. The Team Aon duo of James Nash and Tom Chilton qualified in 19th and 21st respectively but would both start the first race at the back of the grid due to them both requiring a new engine for the event.

Warm-Up
Race two pole sitter D'Aste was the quickest driver in Sunday mornings warm up session, Michelisz was a close second. An engine change for Masaki Kano overnight would send him to the back of the race one grid.

Race One
Menu led from start to finish leading a comfortable Chevrolet 1–2–3 in the opening Suzuka race. The lack of action near the front was representative of much of field, although Gabriele Tarquini jumped up from sixth to fourth at the start to lead home independent race winner Alex MacDowall. Having overtaken James Nash, Alberto Cerqui then quickly ended his race in the gravel at turn one. Mehdi Bennani collided with Aleksei Dudukalo while attempting a pass, Dudukalo held the car and continued while Bennani was forced to pit. Monteiro finished tenth to score a point in the debut race for the Honda Civic. After the race, Dudukalo received a 30-second penalty for colliding with Bennani and he dropped to 18th in the classification, while Nash and Cerqui both received 30-second penalties for start infringements dropping Nash to 19th.

Race Two
D'Aste started on pole position for the reverse grid race, he established a comfortable lead over second placed Oriola to take his second win of the season. Tarquini had jumped up to third place to complete the podium. Behind them, the Chevrolet trio found passing difficult and the Proteam Racing BMW of Bennani held them back for much of the race. Huff and Menu passed on the penultimate lap, while Muller passed Bennani on the final lap. Independent trophy contender Michelisz spun out of the race on the first lap, allowing trophy rival Oriola to close the points gap to 12. The overall championship was once again a tie between Huff and Muller.

Results

Qualifying

Bold denotes Pole position for second race.

Race 1

Bold denotes Fastest lap.

Race 2

Bold denotes Fastest lap.

Standings after the race

Drivers' Championship standings

Yokohama Independents' Trophy standings

Manufacturers' Championship standings

 Note: Only the top five positions are included for both sets of drivers' standings.

References

External links 

Japan